Route 866 is a north-south regional highway in northern Israel.  It begins at Hananya junction with Highway 85 in the south and ends at Meron junction with Highway 89 in the north.

Description of the route
 At 0 km, the route begins at Hananya junction with Highway 85 near Kfar Hananya.
 At 2 km, an access road turns west into Ein el-Asad.
 At 3 km, an access road turns east into Parod.
 At 4 km, an access road turns east into Amirim.
 At 4 km, an access road turns west into Shefer and Hemdat Yamim.
 At 6 km, a road turns east into Kfar Shamai.
 At 10 km, the road ends in Meron at Meron junction with Highway 89.

See also
List of Israeli highways
Route 864 (Israel)

866